A Hidden Life is a 2001 Brazilian drama film directed by Suzana Amaral.

Cast
 Sabrina Greve as Biela
 Eliane Giardini as Constança
 Cacá Carvalho as Conrado
 João Antônio as Dr. Godinho
 Benício Aleixo Bernardo as Truco player
 Neuza Borges as Joviana
 Tânia Botelho as Dona Alice
 Erasmo Xavier da Costa as Truco player 2
 João Luiz Pompeu de Pina as Cavaleiro 2
 Itamar Gonçalves as Gumercindo
 Nayara Guércio as Mazília

Reception
It was entered into the 24th Moscow International Film Festival. At the 34th Festival de Brasília, it won the Best Actress Award (Sabrina Greve) and Best Sound. It received the Best Director, Best Actress (Greve), and Jury's Special awards at the 28th Festival de Cine Iberoamericano de Huelva.

References

External links
 

2001 films
2001 drama films
Brazilian drama films
2000s Portuguese-language films
Films directed by Suzana Amaral
Films set in the 19th century